Angel Rodriguez (born circa 1967) was a Democratic New York City Councilman representing District 38 in Brooklyn (which includes Sunset Park, Red Hook, and South Park Slope).  In 2002, he was arrested on corruption charges for allegedly shaking down “more than $1.5 million (from a real estate developer) in payoffs in exchange for his stamp of approval on a major building project.”  At the time of his arrest, he was co-chairman of the Black and Latino caucus, and headed the subcommittee on Revenue and Forecast.

He was sentenced in June 2003 to 52 months in prison and to pay $18,000 in restitution and fined $25,000. He had pled guilty in 2002 to federal bribery charges.

Rodriguez lives in Sunset Park with his wife and children.  A graduate of the College of Staten Island, he was an accountant.  He is unable to return to accounting as he has lost his license.

He was born and raised in Brooklyn but his mother is from Lares, Puerto Rico.

References

External links
Article which includes his resignation letter, outlining why he pled guilty

Living people
New York City Council members
Hispanic and Latino American New York City Council members
People from Sunset Park, Brooklyn
College of Staten Island alumni
American accountants
New York (state) Democrats
Prisoners and detainees of the United States federal government
New York (state) politicians convicted of crimes
Politicians from Brooklyn
Year of birth missing (living people)